Sasha Toperich, also written as Saša Toperić (born 1972), is a naturalized American and former Bosnian author, academic, diplomat, and strategist. In his youth, Toperich was known as a skilled concert pianist. He is currently the Senior Executive Vice President of the Transatlantic Leadership Network, a Washington, D.C. think tank.

Early life
Toperich was born in Sarajevo, then part of Yugoslavia but now in Bosnia and Herzegovina. He began playing piano at the age of four. During his years of study, he won first prize at the piano students competition in Dubrovnik.

In the early 1990s, Toperich moved to Jerusalem, where he completed formal training at the Rubin Academy of Music and Dance, studying under Irina Berkovich. Later on, Toperich earned his doctoral degree at the Music Academy in Lovran, Croatia, where he studied with Marina Ambokadze.

Piano career
His performances have been broadcast on radio and television programs in France, Austria, Israel, Brazil, the United States, Japan, China, South Korea, Belgium, The Netherlands and the countries of former Yugoslavia. Toperich has performed with conductors such as Zubin Mehta and Kuzushi Ono. In 1997, he earned a nomination as Best Debut Artist after a nationwide broadcast of a concert in Washington, D.C. Known for a combination of sensitivity and technical skill, Toperich was known as one of the world's premier up-and-coming pianists.

In 2004, he became the first concert pianist to perform in Monrovia (Liberia) at a concert organized by Jacques P. Klein, then the United Nations Special Representative in Liberia. The concert was broadcast live throughout the African continent.

Philanthropy
In 1997, he became President of the Children Foundation of UNESCO. He was awarded the honorary title of UNESCO Artist for Peace the following year. However, in 2001, he resigned his honorary title, in protest of UNESCO's decision not to display the work of Tibetan artists on United Nations premises.

In the early 2000s, Toperich's career shifted from concert piano to philanthropy. Toperich founded the America-Bosnia Foundation in 2002, which was established to foster stronger political, cultural and educational ties between the American and Bosnian people. The foundation organizes concerts, exhibitions, lectures, panels, and educational seminars in both Bosnia and Herzegovina and in the United States. ABF's mission is also to strengthen democratic values in Bosnia and preserve its multi-ethnic and multicultural character.

In 2004, in association with Laughing Buddha Music Inc., Toperich launched the “Visas for Life” project, an educational/historic/diplomatic story of Japanese diplomat Chiune Sugihara, who saved around 6000 Jews during World War II by issuing transit visas through Japan, when he served as a Japanese Consul in Kaunas, Lithuania.

Toperich also founded the World Youth Leadership Network in 2004, a not-for-profit organisation that aims to unite the international youth community through good works and cultural exchange, launching it at the UN Headquarters in New York City. WYLN has contributed and donated computers to schools and universities in Liberia, organised a fundraising concert in Monrovia for the Louis Arther Grimes School of Law, and set up an IT centre in Benin in collaboration with the Benin Education Fund and the World Bank to allow students to learn and gain new skills.

Also in 2004, Toperich served as a project manager for the European Youth Peace Summit held in Sarajevo, bringing together around 500 youth leaders from various countries in Europe. Budimir Lončar, former Foreign Minister of Yugoslavia under Marshal Tito, and later, top advisor to Stjepan Mesic, President of Croatia, was Senior Advisor to the Summit.

Diplomacy
Toperich then transitioned to diplomacy. The President of Bosnia and Herzegovina appointed Toperich as Presidential Envoy of Bosnia and Herzegovina to the United States in 2003, holding a rank equivalent to Ambassador. In 2006, he became the first high-ranking diplomat from Bosnia and Herzegovina to officially visit Baghdad after fall of Saddam Hussein. From 2009 -2010, Toperich served as a Counsellor at the Permanent Mission of Bosnia and Herzegovina to the United Nations, with mandate over the country's successful bid to join the United Nations Security Council as a non-permanent member for a two-year term.

Publications
Toperich is a co-author and author of numerous books, papers, and opinion editorials, including:

Unheard Voices of the Next Generation: Emergent Leaders in Libya (Brookings Institution/TLN, 2020).
Maritime Disputes in the Eastern Mediterranean: The Way Forward (Brookings Institution/TLN, 2020).
Algeria and Transatlantic Relations (Brookings Institution/TLN, 2018)
Turkey and Transatlantic Relations (Brookings Institution/CTR, 2017)
'Vision 2020: Bosnia and Herzegovina Towards its European Future (Brookings Institution/CTR, 2017)Iraqi Kurdistan Region: A Path Forward (Brookings Institution/CTR, 2017)Challenges of Democracy in the European Union and its Neighbors (Brookings Institution/CTR, 2015)A New Paradigm: Perspectives on the Changing Mediterranean (Brookings Institution/CTR, 2014)''

His opinion editorials have appeared in The Daily Caller, The Hill, The Huffington Post, and USMilitary.com.

References

1972 births
Living people
People from Sarajevo
Bosnia and Herzegovina pianists
Bosnia and Herzegovina human rights activists
UNESCO officials
Bosnia and Herzegovina officials of the United Nations
21st-century pianists
Naturalized citizens of the United States